Sedgebrook railway station was on the Nottingham to Grantham line in the East Midlands of England. The station lay between Bottesford and Grantham. It served a population of about 900 in the villages of Sedgebrook and Allington and the hamlet of Casthorpe, all in Lincolnshire. It was closed in 1956.

The line
The line opened as the Ambergate, Nottingham, Boston and Eastern Junction Railway on 15 July 1850. It was then leased to the Great Northern Railway in 1855, but remained nominally independent until it was taken over by the London and North Eastern Railway in 1923.

References

Disused railway stations in Lincolnshire
Railway stations in Great Britain opened in 1850
Railway stations in Great Britain closed in 1956
Former Great Northern Railway stations
Thomas Chambers Hine railway stations